Fritz Eiberle (17 September 1904 – 22 September 1987) was a German international footballer.

References

1904 births
1987 deaths
Association football midfielders
German footballers
Germany international footballers
TSV 1860 Munich players